The Altoona Engineers were a short-lived minor league baseball club based in Altoona, Pennsylvania. The team played for just part of the  season in the Middle Atlantic League. The Engineers were only professional baseball team to represent the city between 1912 and 1996. They began the season as the Jeannette Jays, however after posting a 1-11 record, the Jays relocated to Altoona to become the Engineers. However, on July 18, 1931, the team moved to Beaver Falls, Pennsylvania to finish the year as the Beaver Falls Beavers.

Record

References

Baseball teams established in 1931
Sports clubs disestablished in 1931
1931 establishments in Pennsylvania
1931 disestablishments in Pennsylvania
Defunct minor league baseball teams
Altoona, Pennsylvania
Defunct baseball teams in Pennsylvania
Middle Atlantic League teams
Baseball teams disestablished in 1931